Pierre Gachon (born 9 March 1909, date of death unknown) was a Canadian racing cyclist. He rode in the 1937 Tour de France.

References

1909 births
Year of death missing
Canadian male cyclists